is a passenger railway station located in the city of Shimanto, Kōchi Prefecture, Japan. It is operated by the Tosa Kuroshio Railway and has the station number "TK43".

Lines and Trains
Only local trains stop at the station.

Layout
The station consists of two opposed side platforms serving two elevated tracks. There is no station building, but enclosed shelters are provided on both platforms for waiting passengers. Access to platforms is by means of separate flights of steps. A bike shed and parking lots for cars are available near the base of the steps.

Adjacent stations

History

Passenger statistics
In fiscal 2011, the station was used by an average of 71 passengers daily.

Surrounding area
Shimanto City Hall Nakasuji Branch Office
Shimanto Municipal Nakasuji Elementary School
Shimanto Municipal Nakasuji Junior High School
Japan National Route 56

See also
 List of railway stations in Japan

References

External links
Station timetable

Railway stations in Kōchi Prefecture
Railway stations in Japan opened in 1997
Shimanto, Kōchi (city)